BC: The Archaeology of the Bible Lands was a BBC television series from the 1970s. It investigated the archaeology of the Bible lands. It was presented by Magnus Magnusson.  The consultant on Biblical archaeology was James B. Pritchard of the University of Pennsylvania, where he was professor of religious thought and the first curator of Biblical archaeology at the University Museum.  A book of the programmes was published in March 1977. There were twelve programmes in the series, each of an hour duration, and the book's twelve chapters share their titles and subject matter.

The first programme was shown on BBC2 on 20 January 1977 following filming the previous year in Egypt, Jordan, Israel, Syria and Iraq.  The rest were shown at weekly intervals.

The purpose and tone of the programmes is indicated by this extract from the Foreword that Dr Pritchard wrote for the book:

Episodes

References

BBC television documentaries
Biblical archaeology